The Kolongongo War was a war fought between the Mbunda people and the Portuguese in 1914. The war occurred as a result of the Portuguese's desire to expand their powers which was met with resistance by the Mbunda people. Mbunda people often travelled around Africa trading goods and had minimal settlement until approximately 1700 when they settled in what is now south-eastern Angola.

References

Wars involving Portugal
1914 in Africa
1914 in Portugal
Conflicts in 1914
Wars involving the states and peoples of Africa
African resistance to colonialism